Fritz Luchsinger (born c. 1951) is a former Swiss curler.

He is the Honorary President of CC Stäfa. At the time of the 1987 World Championship, he was employed as a life insurance salesman and was married.

Teams

References

External links
 

Living people
Swiss male curlers
European curling champions
Swiss curling champions
1950s births